Shobhana Bhartia (born 4 January 1957) is an Indian businesswoman. She is the chairperson and editorial director of the HT Media, one of India's largest newspapers and media houses, which she inherited from her father. She has also recently taken charge as the Chancellor BITS School of Management and Pro-Chancellor of BITS-Pilani (Birla Institute of Technology and Science, Pilani) which was founded by her grandfather G. D. Birla and is the current chairperson of Endeavor India.

Closely associated with the Congress party, Shobhana served as a nominated member of the Rajya Sabha, the upper chamber of the Indian parliament from 2006 to 2012. In 2016, she was listed as the 93rd most powerful woman in the World by Forbes She is married to Shyam Sunder Bhartia, owner of Noida based Jubilant Bhartia Group.

Background 
Born in a Marwari family on 4 January 1957, Bhartia is the daughter of the industrialist and Congress party member KK Birla, and the grand-daughter of GD Birla, one of the Birla family patriarchs. The KK Birla family owned 75.36 per cent stake in HT Media, valued at ₹834 crores in 2004. She grew up in Kolkata and had her schooling at Loreto House. She is a graduate of Calcutta University, and is married to Shyam Sunder Bhartia, Chairman of the ₹1400 crore pharmaceutical firm Jubilant LifeScience Limited (a spinoff from the earlier chemicals venture Vam Organics). Shyam Sunder Bhartia is son of Late Mohan Lal Bhartia. She has two sons, Priyavrat Bhartiya, born on 4 October 1976 and Shamit Bhartiya, born on 27 April 1979. Their son Shamit Bhartia is also a Director at the HT Media group, and also looks after lifestyle businesses such as the Domino's Pizza franchise and also convenience store chain Monday to Sunday in Bangalore. In 2013, Shamit Bhartia married Nayantara Kothari, daughter of Bhadrashyam Kothari, a Chennai-based industrialist and Nina, daughter of Dhirubhai Ambani.

Media career 
Bhartia joined Hindustan Times in 1986, as a 29 year old and directly as Chief Executive. She was the first woman chief executive of a national newspaper and probably one of the youngest. She is considered to be one of the motive forces behind the transformation of the Hindustan Times "into a bright, young paper." She looks after editorial as well as financial aspects, and is credited with raising ₹400 crore through a public equity launch of HT Media in September 2005.

She has received the Global Leader of Tomorrow award from the World Economic Forum (1996).  She is also the recipient of
the Outstanding Business Woman of the Year, 2001, by PHD Chamber of Commerce & Industry, and National Press India Award, 1992. She has also won the Business Woman award, The Economic Times Awards for Corporate Excellence awards 2007. She was named one of Forbes Asia's 50 Women in the Mix. She has received the Delhi Women of the Decade Achievers Award 2013 from the ASSOCHAM Ladies League in recognition for her Excellence in Nation Building through Media & Leadership. The ht media is also famous for his court cases there are many cases on ht media but the one case on Ht media vs aita Ram and others are still running in hight court , supreme court and patiala house court since 18 years the case is started on 2004 and they dismissed their 272 employees without giving any notice or reason and they exploit them. they all suffering from past 18 years

Political career 
Shobhana was one of the first Padma Shri award nominees in 2005. The award was given for journalism. The following year, in February 2006, Shobhana was nominated to the Rajya Sabha, the upper house of parliament, on a recommendation by the ruling United Progressive Alliance headed by Sonia Gandhi. The nomination, reserved for eminent people from the fields of literature, science, art and social service, was challenged in the Supreme Court of India on the grounds that she was a "media baron" and not a journalist, and that she was politically affiliated with the Indian National Congress.  However, the court dismissed the appeal at the admission stage itself, saying that the scope of "social service" was broad enough to include her. She introduced "The Child Marriage (Abolition) and Miscellaneous Provisions Bill, 2006". Among her close friends included BJP politician Arun Jaitley.

References

External links 
 Shobhana Bhartia on Forbes

1957 births
Living people
Recipients of the Padma Shri in literature & education
Birla family
Rajasthani people
Nominated members of the Rajya Sabha
University of Calcutta alumni
Marwari people
Indian mass media owners
Indian newspaper editors
Businesswomen from Delhi
Indian women editors
Indian editors
Hindustan Times
20th-century Indian journalists
20th-century Indian women writers
20th-century Indian businesspeople
20th-century Indian businesswomen
Indian women business executives
Indian business executives
21st-century Indian women writers
21st-century Indian writers
21st-century Indian businesspeople
21st-century Indian journalists
21st-century Indian businesswomen
Women newspaper editors
Women members of the Rajya Sabha